The Universal Copyright Convention (UCC), adopted in Geneva, Switzerland, in 1952, is one of the two principal international conventions protecting copyright; the other is the Berne Convention.

The UCC was developed by the United Nations Educational, Scientific and Cultural Organization (UNESCO) as an alternative to the Berne Convention for those states that disagreed with aspects of the Berne Convention but still wished to participate in some form of multilateral copyright protection. These states included developing countries as well as the United States and most of Latin America. The developing countries thought that the strong copyright protections granted by the Berne Convention overly benefited Western, developed, copyright-exporting nations; whereas the United States and Latin America were already members of the Buenos Aires Convention, a Pan-American copyright convention that was weaker than the Berne Convention. The Berne Convention states also became party to the UCC, so that their copyrights would exist in non-Berne convention states. In 1973 the Soviet Union joined the UCC.

The United States only provided copyright protection for a fixed renewable term, and required that, for a work to be copyrighted, it must contain a copyright notice and be registered at the Copyright Office. The Berne Convention, on the other hand, provided for copyright protection for a single term based on the life of the author, and did not require registration or the inclusion of a copyright notice for copyright to exist. Thus the United States would have to make several major modifications to its copyright law to become a party to the Berne Convention. At the time, the United States was unwilling to do so. The UCC thus permits those states that had a system of protection similar to the United States for fixed terms at the time of signature to retain them. Eventually, the United States became willing to participate in the Berne Convention and change its national copyright law as required. In 1989 it became a party to the Berne Convention as a result of the Berne Convention Implementation Act of 1988.

Under the Second Protocol of the Universal Copyright Convention (Paris text), protection under U.S. copyright law is expressly required for works published by the United Nations, by UN specialized agencies and by the Organization of American States (OAS). The same requirement applies to other contracting states as well.

Berne Convention states were concerned that the existence of the UCC would encourage parties to the Berne Convention to leave that convention and adopt the UCC instead. So the UCC included a clause stating that parties which were also Berne Convention parties need not apply the provisions of the Convention to any former Berne Convention state that renounced the Berne Convention after 1951. Thus, any state that has once adopted the Berne Convention is penalised if it then decides to renounce the Berne Convention and use the UCC protections instead, as its copyrights might no longer exist in Berne Convention states.

Since almost all countries are either members or aspiring members of the World Trade Organization (WTO), and thus comply with the Agreement on Trade-Related Aspects of Intellectual Property Rights Agreement (TRIPS), the UCC has lost significance.

See also
 International copyright
List of parties to the Universal Copyright Convention

References

External links

Geneva text of the UCC from 6 September 1952.
Paris text of the UCC from 14 July 1971.
States Parties of UCC, with Appendix Declaration relating to Article XVII and Resolution concerning Article XI. Geneva, 6 September 1952..
States Parties of UCC as revised on 24 July 1971, with Appendix Declaration relating to Article XVII and Resolution concerning Article XI. Paris, 24 July 1971..

Copyright treaties
Treaties concluded in 1952
Treaties concluded in 1971
Treaties entered into force in 1974
Treaties of Algeria
Treaties of Argentina
Treaties of Andorra
Treaties of Australia
Treaties of Austria
Treaties of Azerbaijan
Treaties of the Bahamas
Treaties of Bangladesh
Treaties of Barbados
Treaties of Belgium
Treaties of Belize
Treaties of Bolivia
Treaties of Bosnia and Herzegovina
Treaties of the Second Brazilian Republic
Treaties of the People's Republic of Bulgaria
Treaties of the Kingdom of Cambodia (1953–1970)
Treaties of Cameroon
Treaties of Canada
Treaties of Chile
Treaties of the People's Republic of China
Treaties of Colombia
Treaties of Costa Rica
Treaties of Croatia
Treaties of Cyprus
Treaties of Cuba
Treaties of Czechoslovakia
Treaties of the Czech Republic
Treaties of Denmark
Treaties of the Dominican Republic
Treaties of Ecuador
Treaties of El Salvador
Treaties of Fiji
Treaties of Finland
Treaties of the French Fourth Republic
Treaties of West Germany
Treaties of Ghana
Treaties of the Kingdom of Greece
Treaties of Guatemala
Treaties of Guinea
Treaties of Haiti
Treaties extended to Hong Kong
Treaties of the Hungarian People's Republic
Treaties of Iceland
Treaties of India
Treaties of Ireland
Treaties of Israel
Treaties of Italy
Treaties of Japan
Treaties of Kazakhstan
Treaties of Kenya
Treaties of South Korea
Treaties of the Kingdom of Laos
Treaties of Lebanon
Treaties of Liberia
Treaties of Liechtenstein
Treaties of Luxembourg
Treaties of North Macedonia
Treaties of Malawi
Treaties of Malta
Treaties of Mauritius
Treaties of Mexico
Treaties of Monaco
Treaties of Montenegro
Treaties of Morocco
Treaties of the Netherlands
Treaties of New Zealand
Treaties of Nicaragua
Treaties of Niger
Treaties of Nigeria
Treaties of Norway
Treaties of the Dominion of Pakistan
Treaties of Panama
Treaties of Paraguay
Treaties of Peru
Treaties of the Philippines
Treaties of the Polish People's Republic
Treaties of the Estado Novo (Portugal)
Treaties of the Soviet Union
Treaties of Rwanda
Treaties of Saint Vincent and the Grenadines
Treaties of Saudi Arabia
Treaties of Senegal
Treaties of Serbia and Montenegro
Treaties of Slovakia
Treaties of Slovenia
Treaties of Francoist Spain
Treaties of Sri Lanka
Treaties of Sweden
Treaties of Switzerland
Treaties of Trinidad and Tobago
Treaties of Tunisia
Treaties of the United Kingdom
Treaties of the United States
Treaties of Uruguay
Treaties of the Holy See
Treaties of Venezuela
Treaties of Yugoslavia
Treaties of Zambia
Treaties of Russia
Treaties extended to Portuguese Macau
Treaties extended to British Hong Kong
Treaties extended to the British Virgin Islands
Treaties extended to Gibraltar
Treaties extended to the Isle of Man
Treaties extended to Saint Helena, Ascension and Tristan da Cunha
Treaties extended to British Saint Lucia
Treaties extended to British Saint Vincent and the Grenadines
Treaties extended to the Crown Colony of Seychelles
Treaties extended to Guam
Treaties extended to the Panama Canal Zone
Treaties extended to Puerto Rico
Treaties extended to the United States Virgin Islands
Treaties extended to Greenland
Treaties extended to the Faroe Islands